I Come in Peace (released under the alternative title Dark Angel) is a 1990 American science fiction action film directed by Craig R. Baxley, and starring Dolph Lundgren, Brian Benben, Betsy Brantley and Matthias Hues. The film was released in the United States on September 28, 1990. 

The film is about a rule-breaking vice cop who becomes involved in the investigation of mysterious drug-related murders on the streets of Houston, Texas.

The original title is Dark Angel; the film was planned to be released under the same title in the United States (which had the latest release) but was renamed by Triumph Releasing to I Come in Peace because of two other movies entitled The Dark Angel (from 1925 and 1935), according to executive producer Mark Damon (in a 1993 interview with UK magazine Impact), who preferred the original title.

Plot 
Houston police officer Jack Caine will not let police procedure prevent him from pursuing his mission to wipe out the White Boys, a gang of white collar drug dealers who killed his partner while Caine was stopping a convenience store robbery.

The White Boys disguise their narcotics trafficking behind the visage of expensive luxury sports cars, executive level jobs, and flashy designer suits. Led by the vicious but urbane Victor Manning, the White Boys operate above accusation but not suspicion. When the White Boys steal a shipment of heroin from a federal evidence warehouse, they hide evidence of their involvement by  blowing up the facility, killing or injuring numerous people. This brings in the FBI, and Caine is partnered with a by-the-book agent, Arwood "Larry" Smith. They investigate the drug theft and the later murder of several key White Boys soldiers by a hyper fast spinning disk. At the same time, Caine is made aware - via his girlfriend, coroner Diane Pallone - of a series of strange drug-related deaths. The corpses are full of heroin, but the cause of death is a puncture wound to the forehead. Unknown to Caine and the police, the deaths are caused by Talec, an alien who is extracting something from the victims. He is being pursued by Azeck, a similar alien to himself.

Azeck soon tracks Talec to a supermarket where a battle ensues. After being severely injured in the fight, Azeck is able to sneak into Caine's car as he and Smith investigate the bloody scene left at the super market. After Caine and Smith are ordered off the investigation by their superiors, they discover the mortally wounded Azeck in the back seat. Azeck explains that he is a police officer from his own home planet, and that Talec shoots his victims full of synthetic heroin and then uses alien technology to extract the resulting endorphins from their brains, synthesizing them into a drug called "Barsi" to be used by addicts on his home planet. He warns Caine and Smith that if Talec is not stopped, thousands of intergalactic drug dealers will come to Earth to slaughter its population, since Earth is seen as a cheap source of Barsi, which is extremely rare in the rest of the galaxy. Azeck dies and his body cremates itself - but Smith has retained Azeck's powerful hand-gun and intends to pass it onto his FBI superior to prove that the aliens exist. Caine warns that Switzer should not be trusted and wants to give the gun to his own supervisor, Chief Malone. The two disagree and separate.

Smith gives the weapon to Inspector Switzer, who reveals that the FBI already know about the aliens, and they intend on opening dialogue with Talec in order to gain technological and weapon advantages. He then attempts to shoot Smith, but Caine saves him at the last moment. Thanks to information from Azeck, they track Talec down to an industrial complex but are waylaid by the White Boys who believe Caine to be behind the deaths of their soldiers. Talec arrives in the middle of the standoff and kills the remaining White Boys before being forced to retreat after Smith uses Azeck's weapon against him.

At the complex, Azeck's weapon runs out of charge and Talec attempts to kill Caine using his drug harpoon. While fending off the harpoon Caine grabs a vial of the synthesized Barsi drug and the two engage in hand-to-hand combat over the vial, resulting in Talec being impaled on a steel spike. Cain retrieves Talec's gun - a similar weapon to Azeck's - and shoots nearby drums of fuel, killing Talec in the resulting explosion.

With Talec dead, Caine and Smith realize that they have completed Azeck's mission: Talec will not return to his home world, and since no other drug dealers from his home planet know about Earth, there will be no invasion.

Cast 
 Dolph Lundgren as Detective Jack Caine, a Houston police detective investigating a string of drug-related murders.
 Brian Benben as Special Agent Arwood "Larry" Smith, an FBI agent and Caine's new partner.
 Betsy Brantley as Diane Pallone, a coroner and Caine's girlfriend.
 Matthias Hues as Talec, an extraterrestrial drug dealer.
 Jay Bilas as Azeck, an extraterrestrial police officer. Unlike Talec, he is fluent in English.
 Jim Haynie as Captain Malone, Caine's boss.
 David Ackroyd as Inspector Switzer, Smith's boss.
 Sherman Howard as Victor Manning, a white collar drug dealer and boss of the White Boys.
 Sam Anderson as Warren, underboss of the White Boys.
 Alex Morris as Detective Ray Turner, Caine's original partner. He is killed by the White Boys during a sting operation.

The film also stars Mark Lowenthal as Bruce, an eccentric and paranoid scientist; Michael J. Pollard as Boner, a petty criminal; Jesse Vint as McMurphy, Talec's first victim; Mimi Cochran as a car mechanic; Jack Willis as a liquor store owner; Tony Brubaker as a garage sweeper; Brandon Smith as a market clerk; and Al Leong (credited as Albert Leong) as a luggage salesman who tries to rip off the White Boys.

Production

Development and writing

Screenwriter David Koepp was credited as Leonard Maas Jr. Vision PDG was the only credited production company. In April 1989, after filming went two weeks over its deadline, the film's principal photography wrapped in Houston, Texas. Although the film was planned for release for August 3, 1990, it was eventually pushed back to September 28.

Music

Soundtrack 
The closing credits include "Touch Me Tonight" by Shooting Star, which had previously charted on the Billboard Hot 100 at number 67.

Release

Theatrical
I Come In Peace was released in the United States on September 28, 1990. The film was released as Dark Angel in other territories.

Home media
After the film's theatrical run, it was released on VHS and laserdisc in 1991 by Media Home Entertainment. A Region 2 (widescreen) and Region 4 (fullscreen) DVD is available in Europe, Japan and Australia. In September 2011, in the US a Manufactured On Demand widescreen DVD from MGM Classics Collection was available online. It was released under its original title, "Dark Angel".

A Blu-ray was released on August 27, 2013 by Shout! Factory as part of their Scream Factory label. This edition contains a 24 minutes retrospective featurette with new interview of the director Craig Baxley, Dolph Lundgren and Brian Benben, as well as a gallery of rare vintage posters, lobby cards and stills.

Reception

Critical response 
Rotten Tomatoes, a review aggregator, reports that 36% of 28 surveyed critics gave the film a positive review; the average rating is 4.4/10.  Contemporary reviews were generally negative. Kevin Thomas of the Los Angeles Times called it "stale through and through, derived from countless cop-buddy formula thrillers, drenched in violence and devoid of so much as a whiff of real life."  Caryn James of The New York Times wrote, "This story turns out to be much more mundane than its outrageously clever premise."  Dave Kehr of the Chicago Tribune wrote that the film's imaginative weapons and humor make it an entertaining crowd-pleaser but criticized its cynical violence and lack of moral consciousness.  Richard Harrington of The Washington Post compared it to Hardware and said its influences are more subtle, though it suffers from using too much humor.  Chris Hicks of the Deseret News wrote that the film "isn't as bad as it has every right to be" and "provides some fun for fans of the genre". Lou Cedrone of The Baltimore Sun wrote, "Apart from the gore, I Come in Peace is an amusing mixture of action, science-fiction and comedy."  Gary Thompson of the Philadelphia Daily News said that it is a better than usual rip-off of The Terminator with some original ideas.  Time Out London wrote, "With an upbeat script and a healthy sense of humour, this is an unashamedly ridiculous affair with moderate ambitions and matching success."

More recent reviews have been more enthusiastic. Patrick Cooper of Bloody Disgusting rated it 4/5 stars and wrote that the film "is ripe for cult rediscovery." Anthony Arrigo of Dread Central rated it 4/5 stars and called it "one helluva fun time" and "a wildly entertaining, often brutal ride". Fred Topel of CraveOnline rated it 7/10 and wrote, "I Come In Peace is probably as good as it gets for theatrical leading man Dolph, and I highly recommend it."  David Johnson of DVD Verdict called it "a gonzo slice of B-grade sci-fi tomfoolery".  Ian Jane of DVD Talk rated it 3.5/5 stars and wrote that "it's about as brainless as an action movie can get but you can't help but have fun with it."

Sequel 
Co-star Matthias Hues lobbied for a sequel from the early 2000s until 2016.

See also 
 Liquid Sky, a movie wherein an alien extracts endorphins from humans at the point of orgasm, killing them.
 Not of This Earth

References

External links 
 
 
 
 
   

1990 films
1990s buddy cop films
1990s science fiction action films
1990s chase films
American science fiction action films
American buddy cop films
American chase films
1990s English-language films
Films about drugs
Films about extraterrestrial life
Films directed by Craig R. Baxley
Films set in Houston
Films shot in Houston
American police detective films
Films with screenplays by David Koepp
Triumph Films films
American films about revenge
1990s American films